Rachel Rochat (born 10 September 1972) is a Swiss ice hockey player. She competed in the women's tournament at the 2006 Winter Olympics.

References

1972 births
Living people
Swiss women's ice hockey players
Olympic ice hockey players of Switzerland
Ice hockey players at the 2006 Winter Olympics
Sportspeople from Summit, New Jersey